This paleomammalogy list records new  fossil mammal taxa that were described during the year 2011, as well as notes other significant paleomammalogy discoveries and events which occurred during that year.

Newly named taxa

Newly named eutherians

Notes

References

2011 in paleontology